Haider Khan (born 30 November 1932) is a Pakistani athlete. He competed in the men's shot put and the men's discus throw at the 1960 Summer Olympics.

References

1932 births
Living people
Athletes (track and field) at the 1960 Summer Olympics
Pakistani male shot putters
Pakistani male discus throwers
Olympic athletes of Pakistan
Place of birth missing (living people)